
Orccococha (possibly from Quechua urqu male / mountain, qucha lake,  "mountain lake" or "male lake") is a lake in Peru located in the Cusco Region, Chumbivilcas Province, Velille District. Orccococha lies south-east of Velille and south of the lake Querquecocha.

References 

Lakes of Peru
Lakes of Cusco Region